The Girl on the Boat is a 1962 British comedy film directed by Henry Kaplan and starring Norman Wisdom, Millicent Martin and Richard Briers. It is based on the 1922 novel of the same name by P.G. Wodehouse.

Plot
During the 1920s, two young men returning to England on a transatlantic liner fall in love with two fellow passengers.

Cast
 Norman Wisdom - Sam Marlowe
 Millicent Martin - Billie Bennett
 Richard Briers - Eustace Hignett
 Philip Locke - Bream Mortimer
 Sheila Hancock - Jane
 Athene Seyler - Mrs Hignett
 Bernard Cribbins - Peters
 Noel Willman - Webster
 Reginald Beckwith - Barman
 Timothy Bateson - Purser
 Peter Bull - Blacksmith
 Martin Wyldeck - J.P. Mortimer
 William Sherwood - Mr Bennett
 Georgina Cookson - Passenger

Critical reception
Sky Movies: "Something of a departure for Norman Wisdom...Wisdom was not to stray from formula again until the conclusion of his string of crazy comedies for Rank". The Radio Times comments: "Norman Wisdom tried something different from his usual slapstick with this seagoing comedy romance ...It doesn't work for Wisdom, though it does for the less mannered professionals in support such as Richard Briers, Millicent Martin and Athene Seyler". Allmovie: "Like Jerry Lewis, Norman Wisdom is an acquired taste, but he's worth sampling at least once".

References

External links

1961 films
1961 comedy films
British comedy films
Films based on works by P. G. Wodehouse
Films set in the 1920s
Seafaring films
1960s English-language films
1960s British films